This is a list of flag bearers who have represented Tajikistan at the Olympics.

Flag bearers carry the national flag of their country at the opening ceremony of the Olympic Games.

See also
Tajikistan at the Olympics

References

Tajikistan at the Olympics
Tajikistan
Olympic flagbearers